"People Like Us" is a song written by David Lee Murphy and Kim Tribble, and recorded by American country music artist, Aaron Tippin. It was released on January 8, 2001 as the second single from the album of the same name.  The song reached number 17 on the Billboard Hot Country Singles & Tracks chart.

Music video
The music video was directed by Trey Fanjoy and premiered in February 2001.

Chart performance
"People Like Us" debuted at number 59 on the U.S. Billboard Hot Country Singles & Tracks for the week of January 13, 2001.

References

2001 singles
2000 songs
Aaron Tippin songs
Songs written by David Lee Murphy
Lyric Street Records singles
Songs written by Kim Tribble